The Uzbekistan men's national volleyball team represents Uzbekistan in international volleyball competitions and friendly matches. The team is currently ranked 131st in the world.

Records

Asian Championship

Asian Games

References

V
National men's volleyball teams
Volleyball in Uzbekistan
Men's sport in Uzbekistan